Zheldayevka is a rural locality (a settlement) in Maloprivalovskoye Rural Settlement, Verkhnekhavsky District, Voronezh Oblast, Russia. The population was 79 as of 2010. There are 2 streets.

Geography 
Zheldayevka is located 21 km west of Verkhnyaya Khava (the district's administrative centre) by road. Yenino is the nearest rural locality.

References 

Rural localities in Verkhnekhavsky District